Paragon of Dissonance is the sixth studio album by the British doom metal band Esoteric. It is a double album and was released in 2011 through Season of Mist Records. A two-disc vinyl edition of the album was released through Finnish label Svart Records on 25 April 2012.

For unknown reasons, long-time guitarist Gordon Bicknell temporarily left the group early during the recording sessions, the only track that features Bicknell is "Non Being". The majority of the album was written between Greg Chandler, Gordon Bicknell, and Jim Nolan.

Track listing

Credits
Greg Chandler - vocals, guitar, engineer, keys, mastering, mixing, engineering
Gordon Bicknell - guitar, keyboard
Mark Bodossian - bass guitar
Joe Fletcher - drums
Jim Nolan - guitar
Mark Lockett - piano
Mauro Berchi - graphics, layout
Kati Astraeir - artwork

References

External links
Paragon of Dissonance on Discogs
Paragon of Dissonance on Bandcamp

2011 albums
Esoteric (band) albums
Season of Mist albums